Turuptiana lacipea is a moth in the family Erebidae. It was described by Herbert Druce in 1890. It is found in Guatemala.

References

Moths described in 1890
Phaegopterina